McDonald is a village in southern Trumbull County, Ohio, United States, along the Mahoning River. The population was 3,172 at the 2020 census. It is a suburb of the Youngstown–Warren metropolitan area.

History
The community was named after the local McDonald family. It was founded as a company town by Carnegie Steel, later known as U.S. Steel.

Geography

Demographics

2010 census
As of the census of 2010, there were 3,263 people, 1,269 households, and 940 families living in the village. The racial makeup of the village was 97.3% White, 1.1% African American, 0.2% Native American, 0.2% Asian, 0.1% from other races, and 1.1% from two or more races. Hispanic or Latino of any race were 1.5% of the population.

There were 1,269 households, of which 33.1% had children under the age of 18 living with them, 56.2% were married couples living together, 12.9% had a female householder with no husband present, 5.0% had a male householder with no wife present, and 25.9% were non-families. 22.9% of all households were made up of individuals, and 10.7% had someone living alone who was 65 years of age or older. The average household size was 2.57 and the average family size was 3.01.

The median age in the village was 41.3 years. 24.2% of residents were under the age of 18; 7.6% were between the ages of 18 and 24; 23.3% were from 25 to 44; 30.1% were from 45 to 64; and 14.9% were 65 years of age or older. The gender makeup of the village was 48.4% male and 51.6% female.

2000 census
As of the census of 2000, there were 3,481 people, 1,307 households, and 1,001 families living in the village. The population density was 2,072.4 people per square mile (800.0/km2). There were 1,352 housing units at an average density of 804.9 per square mile (310.7/km2). The racial makeup of the village was 97.73% White, 1.01% African American, 0.26% Native American, 0.11% Asian, 0.03% Pacific Islander, 0.20% from other races, and 0.66% from two or more races. Hispanic or Latino of any race were 0.95% of the population.

There were 1,307 households, out of which 34.8% had children under the age of 18 living with them, 61.1% were married couples living together, 12.0% had a female householder with no husband present, and 23.4% were non-families. 21.7% of all households were made up of individuals, and 11.4% had someone living alone who was 65 years of age or older. The average household size was 2.66 and the average family size was 3.11.

In the village, the population was spread out, with 25.9% under the age of 18, 7.4% from 18 to 24, 27.3% from 25 to 44, 25.5% from 45 to 64, and 13.9% who were 65 years of age or older. The median age was 38 years. For every 100 females, there were 90.6 males. For every 100 females age 18 and over, there were 84.6 males.

The median income for a household in the village was $41,738, and the median income for a family was $51,346. Males had a median income of $37,935 versus $22,219 for females. The per capita income for the village was $18,173. About 2.9% of families and 4.0% of the population were below the poverty line, including 4.5% of those under age 18 and 4.4% of those age 65 or over.

References

Villages in Trumbull County, Ohio
Villages in Ohio
Company towns in Ohio